There are at least 12 named lakes and reservoirs in Grant County, Arkansas.

Lakes
	Moores Lake, el.  
	Nall Lake, el.  
	Tolar Lake, el.  
	Tull Lake, el.

Reservoirs
	Clear Lake, el.  
	Cox Creek Lake, el.  
	Fiser Lake, el.  
	Horne Lake, el.  
	Lake Brown, el.  
	Lake Kay, el.  
	Stephens Lake, el.  
	Whitworth Lake, el.

See also

 List of lakes in Arkansas

Notes

Bodies of water of Grant County, Arkansas
Grant